Aage Jørgensen (2 December 1903 – 2 January 1967) was a Danish footballer. He played in seven matches for the Denmark national football team from 1923 to 1929.

References

External links
 

1903 births
1967 deaths
Danish men's footballers
Denmark international footballers
Place of birth missing
Association footballers not categorized by position